Berkshire Township is one of the eighteen townships of Delaware County, Ohio, United States. The population at the 2010 census was 3,085, up from 2,251 at the 2000 census.

Geography
Located in the eastern part of the county, it borders the following townships:
Kingston Township - north
Porter Township - northeast corner
Trenton Township - east
Harlem Township - southeast corner
Genoa Township - south
Orange Township - southwest corner
Berlin Township - west
Brown Township - northwest corner

Two villages are located in Berkshire Township: Galena in the south, and most of Sunbury in the east.

History
It is the only Berkshire Township statewide.

Berkshire Township was settled by Colonel Moses Byxbe in 1806 and named for Byxbe's former home of Berkshire County, Massachusetts.

Government
The township is governed by a three-member board of trustees, who are elected in November of odd-numbered years to a four-year term beginning on the following January 1. Two are elected in the year after the presidential election and one is elected in the year before it. There is also an elected township fiscal officer, who serves a four-year term beginning on April 1 of the year after the election, which is held in November of the year before the presidential election. Vacancies in the fiscal officership or on the board of trustees are filled by the remaining trustees.

Public services
Emergency medical services in Berkshire Township are provided by the Delaware County EMS.

References

External links
Township website
County website
Community Library in Sunbury

Townships in Delaware County, Ohio
English-American culture in Ohio
Townships in Ohio